Helm Spencer (31 December 1891 – 7 December 1974) was an English first-class cricketer. A right-arm fast-medium bowler and lower-order right-hand bat, Spencer played for Lancashire, Glamorgan and Wales in 43 matches between 1914 and 1925. He was born at Padiham, Lancashire and died at Burnley, also in Lancashire.

Career
Spencer played Lancashire League cricket for local club Lowerhouse before joining the Lancashire county team in 1913. He played only two matches for Lancashire's first team after a stint in the second team; he took three wickets in those two games.

The First World War then interrupted Spencer's career, and he returned to first-class cricket only in 1923, playing for Glamorgan and Wales. He played 39 matches for Glamorgan, taking 101 wickets at 22.47 including a best of 7/33. Together with seven wickets for Wales, this would leave Spencer with 111 wickets at first-class level, at a bowling average of 22.67. He then returned to the Lancashire League and Lowerhouse, playing as well at Bacup and Colne, until 1937.

Notes

External links
 
 

1891 births
1974 deaths
People from Padiham
English cricketers
Glamorgan cricketers
Lancashire cricketers
Wales cricketers